Anthony Douglas Gillon Dawson (18 October 1916 – 8 January 1992) was a Scottish actor, best known for his supporting roles as villains in films such as Alfred Hitchcock's Dial M for Murder (1954) and Midnight Lace (1960), and playing Professor Dent in the James Bond film Dr. No (1962). He also appeared as Ernst Stavro Blofeld in From Russia with Love (1963) and Thunderball (1965).

Life
Dawson was born in Edinburgh, the son of Ida Violet (Kittel) and Eric Francis Dawson.

Career 
Following Royal Academy of Dramatic Art training and World War II service, he made his film debut in 1943's They Met in the Dark. He went on to appear in such classic British films as The Way to the Stars (1945), The Queen of Spades (1948) and The Wooden Horse (1950), before moving to America in the early 1950s.

It was while there that he appeared on Broadway in the play, and then the subsequent Alfred Hitchcock film of Dial M for Murder (1954), playing C. A. Swann/Captain Lesgate. In the film, he is blackmailed by Tony Wendice (Ray Milland) into murdering his wife Margot (Grace Kelly). In his unpublished memoirs, Rambling Recollections, Dawson reminisced about getting the part:

He had two other memorable roles on his return to Britain, including the evil Marques Siniestro in Hammer's The Curse of the Werewolf (1961) and henchman Professor Dent in the first James Bond film, Dr. No (1962).

Throughout his career he could often be found in the films of director Terence Young, including the aforementioned Dr. No, They Were Not Divided (1950), Valley of Eagles (1951), The Amorous Adventures of Moll Flanders (1965), Triple Cross (1966), Red Sun (1971), Inchon (1982) and The Jigsaw Man (1983). Young also cast him as the physical presence of Ernst Stavro Blofeld in his Bond films From Russia with Love (1963) and Thunderball (1965), stroking the ubiquitous white cat. His face was never seen, however, and Blofeld's voice was provided by Eric Pohlmann. Dawson appeared alongside fellow Bond veterans Adolfo Celi, Lois Maxwell and Bernard Lee in the Italian Bond knockoff O.K. Connery.

After the early 1960s, his roles got progressively smaller, but he continued to act until his death.

Death
He died in Sussex of cancer at the age of 75 in January 1992.

Selected filmography

 Charley's (Big-Hearted) Aunt (1940) – Student (uncredited)
 They Met in the Dark (1943) – 2nd Code Expert
 The Way to the Stars (1945) – Bertie Steen
 Beware of Pity (1946) – Lt. Blannik
 School for Secrets (1946) – Flt. Lt. Norton
 The Queen of Spades (1949) – Fyodor
 They Were Not Divided (1950) – Michael
 The Wooden Horse (1950) – Pomfret
 The Woman in Question (1950) – Inspector Wilson (uncredited)
 I'll Get You for This (1951) – Secret Agent (uncredited)
 The Long Dark Hall (1951) – The Man
 Valley of Eagles (1951) – Sven Nystrom
 Dial M for Murder (1954) – C. J. Swann / Captain Lesgate
 That Lady (1955) – Don Inigo
 Hour of Decision (1957) – Gary Bax
 Action of the Tiger (1957) – Security Officer
 The Haunted Strangler (1958) – Supt. Burk
 Tiger Bay (1959) – Barclay
 Libel (1959) – Gerald Loddon
 Midnight Lace (1960) – Roy Ash
 Offbeat (1961) – James Dawson
 The Curse of the Werewolf (1961) – The Marques Siniestro
 Dr. No (1962) – Professor R.J. Dent
 Seven Seas to Calais (1962) – Lord Burleigh
 From Russia with Love (1963) – Ernst Stavro Blofeld (body only, credited as ?)
 The Yellow Rolls-Royce (1964) – Mickey (uncredited)
 Change Partners (1965) – Ben Arkwright
 The Amorous Adventures of Moll Flanders (1965) – Officer of Dragoons
 Thunderball (1965) – Ernst Stavro Blofeld (body only, uncredited)
 Death Rides a Horse (1966) – Burt Cavanaugh
 Triple Cross (1966) – Major Stillman
 Your Turn to Die (1967) – Dr. Evans
 Dirty Heroes (1967) – American Colonel
 Operation Kid Brother (1967) – Alpha
 The Rover (1967) – Captain Vincent
 Hell Is Empty (1967) – Paul Grant
 A Sky Full of Stars for a Roof (1968) – Samuel Pratt
 Battle of Neretva (1969) – Gen. Morelli
 Rosolino Paternò, soldato... (1970) – Italian General
 Deadlock (1970) – Anthony Sunshine
 Red Sun (1971) – Hyatt
 The Valachi Papers (1972) – Federal Investigator
 The Big Game (1973) – Burton (uncredited)
 Massacre in Rome (1973) – Wilhelm Harster
 Inchon (1981) – Gen. Collins
 The Jigsaw Man (1983) – Vicar
 Pirates (1986) – Spanish Officer
 Ghoulies II (1988) – Priest
 Run for Your Life (1988) – Colonel Moorcroft
  (1990) – Roy

References

External links
 
 

1916 births
1992 deaths
Deaths from cancer in England
Scottish male stage actors
Scottish male film actors
Scottish male television actors
Male actors from Edinburgh
Alumni of RADA
20th-century Scottish male actors
British military personnel of World War II